Cəlayir is a village and municipality in the Agsu District of Azerbaijan. It has a population of 1,437.

References

External links

Populated places in Agsu District